Papua New Guinea and the United Kingdom share King Charles III as their head of state. They have had relations since 1975 when Papua New Guinea gained independence from the then British Dominion of Australia.

References

 
United Kingdom
Bilateral relations of the United Kingdom
Relations of colonizer and former colony